Vladimir Davydov ( – ) was the second son of Lev and Alexandra Davydov, and nephew of the composer Pyotr Ilyich Tchaikovsky, who called him "Bob".

Life
From his earliest years, Davydov showed an aptitude for music and drawing, which was encouraged by his uncle. After he studied at the Imperial School of Jurisprudence in Saint Petersburg, however, Bob decided on a military career and joined the Preobrazhensky Lifeguard regiment. He resigned his commission as a lieutenant in 1897 and moved to Klin, where he helped the composer's brother Modest create a museum to commemorate Tchaikovsky's life. Prone to depression, Davydov turned to morphine and other drugs before he committed suicide in 1906 at the age of 34. He is buried at the town's Dem'ianovo Cemetery.

Relationship with Tchaikovsky
After Tchaikovsky lost the support of Nadezhda von Meck in 1890, he made Davydov his confidant. Tchaikovsky considered relocating from Klin to Saint Petersburg in the last few years of his life so as to live closer to Davydov (a potential move that caused fellow composer Nikolai Rimsky-Korsakov some distress) writing to his brother Modest, "Seeing the importance of Bob in my life is increasing all the time.... To see him, hear him and feel him close to me will soon become for me, it seems, the paramount condition for my happiness." Davydov was one of the party that remained with Tchaikovsky through his final illness. Tchaikovsky named Davydov in his will as the inheritor of the royalties and copyrights to his musical works.

Dedications
Tchaikovsky dedicated his Children's Album of piano works, Op. 39 to Davydov, as well as his Sixth Symphony, Op. 74, the Pathétique.

Notes

References
Brown, David, Tchaikovsky: The Years of Wandering, 1878–1885, (New York: W.W. Norton & Company, 1986). .
Brown, David, Tchaikovsky: The Final Years, 1885–1893, (New York: W.W. Norton & Company, 1991). .
Brown, David, Tchaikovsky: The Man and His Music (New York: Pegasus Books, 2007). .
Holden, Anthony, Tchaikovsky: A Biography (New York: Random House, 1995). .
Taruskin, Richard, Stravinsky and the Russian Traditions: A Biography of the Works Through Mavra, Volume 1 (Oxford and New York: Oxford University Press, 1996). .

External links
Love letters from Tchaikovsky to Vladimir "Bob" Davydov
Tchaikovsky Research article on Vladimir Davydov

1871 births
1906 suicides
Pyotr Ilyich Tchaikovsky
Russian military personnel
Suicides in Russia
1906 deaths